Kemper Addition Historic District is a national historic district located at St. Joseph, Missouri. The district encompasses 74 contributing buildings and 1 contributing site in a predominantly residential section of St. Joseph. It developed between about 1880 and 1950, and includes representative examples of Colonial Revival, Tudor Revival, and American Craftsman style architecture. Notable buildings include the Jacob Spencer House (1912), H. E. Hutchings House (1887), Fred Binz House (c. 1895), Thomas Moseley Duplex (1894), Plaza Apartments (1928-1929), Hickey-Fargrave House (1899, 1915) with alterations by architect Edmond Jacques Eckel (1845–1934),`C. E. Sprague House (1905) by Eckel, David Bartlett House (1900) by Eckel, and Samuel Nave House (1889).

It was listed on the National Register of Historic Places in 2002.

References

Historic districts on the National Register of Historic Places in Missouri
Colonial Revival architecture in Missouri
Tudor Revival architecture in Missouri
Historic districts in St. Joseph, Missouri
National Register of Historic Places in Buchanan County, Missouri